Vadym Rybalchenko (born 24 November 1988, Soviet Union) is Ukrainian football forward. He is a right-footed central forward.

References

External links
 

1988 births
Living people
Ukrainian footballers
FC Arsenal Kyiv players
FC Dynamo-2 Kyiv players
FC Volyn Lutsk players
FC Bukovyna Chernivtsi players
Association football forwards
Footballers from Kyiv
Ukrainian Premier League players
Ukrainian First League players